Inger's bow-fingered gecko (Cyrtodactylus pubisulcus) is a species of gecko that is endemic to Borneo. It is known from Brunei, Sarawak (Malaysia), and West Kalimantan (Indonesia).

References 

Cyrtodactylus
Endemic fauna of Borneo
Reptiles of Brunei
Reptiles of Indonesia
Reptiles of Malaysia
Reptiles described in 1958
Taxa named by Robert F. Inger
Reptiles of Borneo